(born 1961 in Mie Prefecture) is a Japanese science fiction writer.

After a career as a CAD programmer and game designer, he was first published in 1992, the Creguian game novelization.

He admires Arthur C. Clarke, and his own works are classified as hard science fiction, favoring planetary science as a theme.  His Rocket Girls series deals with human spaceflight in a light novel form with hard SF backing; the reason that only girls are hired as astronauts in the novels is for their light weight.

Awards
2002: Seiun Award Best Novel of the Year for 
2008: Seiun Award Best Short Story of the Year for 
2009: Seiun Award Best Short Story of the Year for

Bibliography

English

References

Entry in The Encyclopedia of Science Fiction

Japanese science fiction writers
1961 births
Living people
Writers from Mie Prefecture